Johnny "John" Hurring (born 16 September 1984 from Christchurch) is a New Zealand professional darts player who plays in the Professional Darts Corporation events.

Career
Hurring made his World Series of Darts debut at the 2018 Auckland Darts Masters as a late replacement for Corey Cadby, where he missed match darts against the then-reigning world champion Rob Cross, but would lose the match 6–5.

References

External links

1984 births
Living people
New Zealand darts players
Professional Darts Corporation associate players
People from Christchurch